Espérance Sportive de Tunis Handball (Arabic: الترجي الرياضي التونسي لكرة اليد) is a Tunisian handball team based in Tunis, that plays in Tunisian Professional Handball League. The club holds 34 domestic league title, setting a world record, as well as various continental and regional titles.

Honours

National titles
 Tunisian Handball League :(34)
Champions : 1966–67, 1968–69, 1970–71, 1971–72, 1972–73, 1973–74, 1974–75, 1975–76, 1976–77, 1977–78, 1978–79, 1979–80, 1980–81, 1981–82, 1982–83, 1983–84, 1984–85, 1990–91, 1991–92, 1992–93, 1994–95, 1996–97, 2003–04, 2004–05, 2008–09, 2009–10, 2011–12, 2012-13, 2013-14, 2015-16, 2016-17, 2018-19, 2019-20, 2020-21
 Tunisian Handball Cup :(28)
Champions : 1959–60, 1969–70, 1970–71, 1971–72, 1972–73, 1973–74, 1974–75, 1975–76, 1977–78, 1978–79, 1979–80, 1980–81, 1981–82, 1982–83, 1983–84, 1984–85, 1985–86, 1991–92, 1992–93, 1993–94, 1994–95, 2001–02, 2004–05, 2005–06, 2012-13, 2017-18, 2020-21, 2021-22.
 Tunisian Handball Super Cup :(2)
Winners : 1999–00, 2001–02
 Coupe de la Fédération :(1)
Winners : 2019

International titles
African Handball Champions League :(2)
 Champions : 2013, 2022
 Runners-up : 1993, 2005, 2016, 2017

African Handball Cup Winners' Cup :(3)
 Champions : 2003, 2014, 2015
 Runners-up : 2004, 2016

African Handball Super Cup :(2)
 Winners: 2014, 2016
 Runners-up : 2004

Regional titles
 Arab Handball Championship of Champions :(7)
 Champions : 1976, 1977, 1978, 1979, 2018, 2021, 2022
 Runners-up : 1980, 2001
 Arab Handball Championship of Winners' Cup :(1)
 Champions : 2013
 Arab Handball Super Cup :(1)
 Champions : 2019

 Double
 Winners (19): 1970–71, 1971–72, 1972–73, 1973–74, 1974–75, 1975–76, 1977–78, 1978–79, 1979–80, 1980–81, 1981–82, 1982–83, 1983–84, 1984–85, 1991–92, 1992–93, 1994–95, 2004–05, 2012–13 
 Triple
 Winners (1): 2012–13

Worldwide
 Super Globe
 Fifth-Place (3): 2014, 2016, 2022
 Sixth-Place (1): 2017

Team

Current squad

Notable players
  Wissem Hmam
  Issam Tej
  Heykel Megannem
  Mahmoud Gharbi
  Jaleleddine Touati
  Makrem Jerou
  Kamel Alouini

External links
Official website
Official facebook Page

Sport in Tunis
Tunisian handball clubs
Handball clubs established in 1957
1957 establishments in Tunisia